Mouda Zeyada (born 13 April 1995) is an Egyptian equestrian. He made his debut appearance at the Olympics representing Egypt at the 2020 Summer Olympics. He competed in the individual jumping.

References 

1995 births
Living people
Egyptian male equestrians
Show jumping riders
Olympic equestrians of Egypt
Equestrians at the 2020 Summer Olympics
Sportspeople from Alexandria
20th-century Egyptian people
21st-century Egyptian people
Competitors at the 2022 Mediterranean Games
Mediterranean Games silver medalists for Egypt
Mediterranean Games medalists in equestrian